Agne Lennart Andersson (later Agnred, 17 January 1914 – 18 December 1997) was a Swedish triple jumper. He competed at the 1936 Summer Olympics and 1938 European Athletics Championships and finished in 19th and 6th place, respectively.

Andersson held national titles in the triple jump in 1937–38 and in the standing high jump in 1937.

References

1914 births
1997 deaths
Swedish male triple jumpers
Olympic athletes of Sweden
Athletes (track and field) at the 1936 Summer Olympics
Sportspeople from Lund